The 2021 FFA Cup Final was the final match of the 2021 FFA Cup. It was contested between Melbourne Victory and Central Coast Mariners on 5 February 2022 at the AAMI Park in Melbourne.

The 2021 final was the first since the 2019 FFA Cup Final, after the 2020 FFA Cup was cancelled due to the COVID-19 pandemic in Australia. Following the quarter-final win for Melbourne Victory against Adelaide United, the final would not feature Adelaide for the first time since 2016.

This was Mariners' first FFA Cup final, and their first final in any competition since their win in the 2013 A-League Grand Final. This was Victory's second FFA Cup final and the first since 2015, in which they were victorious.

The 2021 FFA Cup Final was the last final played under the FFA Cup name; from 2022, the competition will be known as the Australia Cup.

Route to the final

Melbourne Victory, as an A-League team finishing in the bottom four in the 2020–21 A-League, entered into an A-League playoff round..

Meanwhile, Central Coast Mariners entered in the round of 32. Their first match was away to National Premier Leagues NSW side Blacktown City in Mudgee. The Mariners won 1–0 through a second-half goal to Béni Nkololo. In the next round they drew another NPL NSW side, Wollongong Wolves. They went behind early after goalkeeper Mark Birighitti conceded a penalty and was sent off for violent conduct, however, recovered to win 2–1 through second-half goals to Moresche and debutant Harry McCarthy. In the quarter-finals, the Mariners drew a third NPL NSW side, APIA Leichhardt, who upset A-League Men side Western Sydney Wanderers in the previous round. The Mariners won 6–0 at Leichhardt Stadium to advance to the semifinals. In the semifinals, the Mariners defeated Sydney FC 1–0 after Marco Ureña scored a second-half penalty.

Pre-match

Venue selection
The Final was originally intended to be at a neutral venue. However, on 27 January 2022, it was confirmed that the winner of the semi-final match between Central Coast Mariners and Melbourne Victory would host the final, subject to a random draw and the eventual participants. After winning the semi-final, Melbourne Victory was confirmed as the host.

Match

Details

Statistics

References

External links
Official website

2021 domestic association football cups
2021 in Australian soccer
Central Coast Mariners FC matches
Melbourne Victory FC matches
Australia Cup finals